Robert O. Wefald (born July 18, 1942) was an American District Court Judge in the South Central Judicial District in North Dakota. He was elected in 1998 and 2004. He retired in 2010. He is the husband of former North Dakota Public Service Commissioner Susan Wefald.

Wefald was born in Excelsior, Minnesota. He graduated from Minot High School in Minot.

Wefald earned his  B.A. from the University of North Dakota in Grand Forks and his J.D. from the University of Michigan Law School.

Wefald served as the 26th North Dakota Attorney General from 1981 through 1984.

2020 Presidential Election
Wefald was one of three people nominated by the Republican Party to vote in the Electoral College in the 2020 Presidential Election on North Dakota's behalf.

External links
North Dakota Supreme Court bio page

1942 births
Living people
People from Excelsior, Minnesota
North Dakota Republicans
North Dakota Attorneys General
North Dakota state court judges
University of North Dakota alumni
University of Michigan Law School alumni
2020 United States presidential electors